On the Run also known as (Trilogy: One) is a 2003 film directed by, written by, and starring Lucas Belvaux.

This is the second installment of the Trilogy series. It constitutes a thriller, and is preceded by Un couple épatant, which is a comedy, and followed by Après la vie, which is a melodrama. In UK the distribution company altered the order of the trilogy placing the second film as the first one.

In the DVD commentary, Belvaux explained that the main idea behind Trilogy is that the main characters in a particular story can be seen as the secondary characters in others; the three films happen at the same time and share a series of common scenes and plot points, complementing each other, but each has its own perspective and style. The audience is left with the duty of piecing the films together, which Belvaux avoided, since editing the three films into one single narrative would have resulted in a very long film with no style of its own.

Cast

Plot 
Most of the film is silent and there are just as few dialogue lines as necessary.

In the initial sequence during the opening credits, in a black screen the audience can hear different sounds of prison gates opening and someone walking down corridors, then shouts are heard and the audience is brought just outside the prison where Bruno Le Roux, a former leftist revolutionary, has just escaped. An accomplice in a mask, Jean-Jean, is waiting for him, he shoots the searchlights and both climb into a car and escape through the streets into the country. They come across a police blockade but manage to escape through a hail of bullets. The next morning Bruno lies on the grass, Jean-Jean is dead. Bruno takes everything in the car and disguises himself.

He heads to Grenoble, France, in the train but runs into the police at the train station; he manages to escape and runs into a safe-house in a garage within an apartment complex. News of his escapade reach other people involved with him in his past, amongst them Jacquillat, a drug dealer and owner of a fronting company related to transportation of goods and Jeanne and Francis, former revolutionaries. Francis wanders if Bruno shall be coming to their place but she is sure that he will try to escape to Italy.

Bruno forges identifications and arranges many looks for himself, steals a car, changes the licence plates and connects a radio scanner so he can hear the feedback of the police on him. The Police are tailing Jeanne. That night Bruno pays a visit to Freddy, who obviously shares some past with him, Le Roux demands to see Jacquillat and Freddy reluctantly agrees to call him after offering help to take Bruno to Italy, which he will not do until some old scores have been settled with Jacquillat. Freddy goes to the back of the shop, Bruno sees from the window a group of policemen and also has a glimpse at Police Inspector Pascal Manise, whom he had seen earlier in the train station, and assumes that Freddy has betrayed him, he leaves the bar and sees Manise enter. He calls Freddy to tell him that it was not a smart move.

Jacquillat has made his office his refuge and sends his henchmen after Le Roux. Freddy fears for his life and has become paranoid as he runs the streets he sees Bruno everywhere but when he arrives at his apartment he seems more relaxed only to be shot at the entrance of his building by Le Roux. Bruno shows up at Jeanne's, it turns out that she was actually expecting him and gives him a bunch of keys that she has been keeping and burns communist pamphlets that she had hidden away in her son's closet for 15 years. While the Police investigate Freddy's murder, Bruno gets a glimpse at Jacquillat but does not engage him, because he is talking to Manise.

Bruno pays a visit to Madame Guiot, the mother of Jean-Jean and tells her that he is dead and that now he will take care of her, she refuses and throws him out. Le Roux goes to an apartment with the new keys but he tries to open the wrong door and a neighbour emerges from the apartment, he apologizes for the mistake and goes to his apartment, but now there is a witness about his looks and knows that he must change his plans. He takes a lot of explosive materials from the apartment and guns and burns the apartment. He bombs the Court House. This triggers the police to arrest Jeanne for questioning but she is still loyal to him and will not say a word.

In the meantime, Le Roux has been following Jacquillat's henchmen and ends up following Banane, a petty drug dealer, who while selling drugs on the street ends up beating a woman, at first Le Roux does not intervene but the beating is so strong that he cannot take it anymore and engages Banane with his gun and forces him to open the letterbox where he hides his drugs, she takes all she can and leaves. Bruno frisks Banane and finds a photo of the woman who has just left; Banane has been ordered not to sell her anything. Bruno poses then as "Yvan" says that he wants to meet Jacquillat. Just as he is about to leave, the woman comes back with news that the police is all around the place. They must wait it out but she is very sick from withdrawal syndrome, she offers to take him to her place where he will be safe after she figures out that the police is looking for him, her husband is Manise and no one shall look for him there.

Once at the apartment she shoots up and falls asleep. Just as he is about to leave, Agnès (the woman) keels over and is about to die due to overdose, Bruno hesitates but finally saves her. While he is washing her wounds in the bathroom she tells him that in 15 years of marriage, her husband has always provided her with all the drugs she wanted but now he has stopped and it is the first time that she has had to buy her own fixes. He promises her to help her get more drugs. He tells her that his name is Pierre.

Jeanne is liberated. Early in the morning Bruno goes to Banane's and learns that a meeting with Jacquillat has been set at 23:00. Later that same morning, while Jeanne is preparing a little celebration for her liberation, Bruno asks her to help him that night, she refuses to help him and the only thing that she will do for him is cross him over the border into Italy. He refuses and reminds her that she has been free and able to live her life only because he and all the others who have spent time in prison have kept their mouths shut, therefore she owes them, he will come at 22:45 for her. Agnès takes "Pierre" to a chalet in the mountains and promises him to get a car.

In the chalet, while preparing for that evening, Bruno is confronted by Cécile the owner of the chalet, because Cécile thinks that her husband is having an affair with Agnès. They tell her that he is Pierre an unemployed machinist and Agnès' lover, after Cécile is more calm she offers to get him a job and leaves.

Bruno goes to Jeanne's but she is not there. He goes alone to the meeting which turns out to be an ambush, there is a shoot out, many are killed. Bruno manages to escape and calls for Jeanne to help him. She takes him to the chalet, where they discuss about Bruno's outdated ideas and demands to know that if he can justify the deaths of several innocent people that they have killed during their terrorist attacks. Jeanne confesses to Francis what she did (she had said earlier that she was helping a friend), but when asked about Le Roux's whereabouts, she still will not say anything.

The next day at the chalet Bruno is confronted again by Cécile, who now believes that he is Agnès' dealer and the one who is blackmailing Manise but he denies it and tells her that Manise actually is a wife beater, she leaves. Bruno knows he has to leave and steals a car that happened to be near the chalet. Once in the city he is cut off by many police blockades, he dumps the car and goes to Jeanne's, but she is not there. When she arrives, Bruno beats Francis to force her to help him. She unwittingly reveals that the police will not search her car because they are not looking for a woman with a child. Bruno has Jeanne tie Francis up and they leave her apartment with the child. They pass the blockade and he then manages to arrive at his safe house in the garage, but does not know that Jeanne has followed him. She then goes to Manise's place and tells him where to find Le Roux. Manise discloses Le Roux's location to both the police and Jacquillat.

Le Roux hears movements outside his hide out and manages to escape, the police and Jacquillat's henchmen have engaged in a shoot out which gives him the opportunity to leave undetected. He goes to Jacquillat's office where he shoots him and takes his car with which he goes to the chalet. He starts climbing the Alps in order to escape to Italy but on the top of a mountain he walks into a crevasse, he tries to climb out but he cannot and sinks to the bottom.

Reception

Desson Thomson from The Washington Post Wrote that "On the Run" is the most cinematic of the three films. It tells its story in stark, often wordless scenes. After his breakout, Bruno (in "On the Run") goes in search of old cohort Jeanne (Catherine Frot), who's living a new life as a teacher, wife and mother; and he's gunning for Jacquillat (Patrick Descamps), a drug dealer whose double cross sent him to prison"Mark Kermode from The Guardian Wrote "Most impressively, the very contemporary theme of rebels succumbing to domestic bliss only to be haunted by the ghosts of a violent past is brilliantly personified by Jeanne (Catherine Frot), a 'good mother' torn between aiding a former comrade and protecting her new family. Imagine the 'school's out' scene from Tarantino's vacuous Kill Bill: Volume One played straight rather than for postmodern thrills and you'll get some sense of the intelligent tension evoked by Belvaux's gem. Urged along by the menacing strings of a lurking double bass score which pursues our anti-hero from the streets to the hills, this is a first class first instalment for Trilogy, and a tough act to follow for Two and Three, whose central characters we have now met and wish to know better"A. O. Scott of The New York Times stated "Mr. Belvaux takes his three-movie gimmick more seriously than he takes the requirements of his chosen genres: On the Run, the supposed thriller, is more numbing than thrilling. (You will have to wait for future reviews to discover how funny the comedy is, and how moving the melodrama.) The movie seems to be aiming for the Zenlike deliberateness that Jean-Pierre Melville showed in transcendent policiers like Le Samouraï and Le Cercle Rouge, but without the necessary rigor or wit." David Stratton from Variety Wrote “On the Run,” a very lean thriller, is a portrait of an obsessed psychopath at war with society. It begins with a literal bang as Bruno Le Roux (played by the writer-director) breaks out of the prison in which he’s served 15 years of a life sentence for his membership in an armed wing of a left-wing revolutionary movement, the Popular Army. Escape sequence is dynamically directed, with the camera placed in the getaway car that careens through the nighttime streets until stopped by a police road-black, whereupon all hell breaks loose.
Ted Shen from Chicago Reader Wrote "The plot is intricate (partly because it can’t afford continuity gaps in the intersecting lives), especially in laying out Bruno’s methodical revenge and subsequent getaway. Behind the camera Belvaux builds suspense with an austere tone and clever false alarms; in front of it he plays Bruno as chivalrous yet ruthless. The least convincing element here is Bruno’s political worldview. The terse, terrific music is by Riccardo Del Fra"

Alternate ending
In the DVD commentary, Belvaux explains that he also shot an alternate ending to Cavale, where Le Roux also kills Alain and Cécile Coste, who had gone to the chalet to look for him to offer "Pierre" a job, but finally decided against it to make Le Roux more accessible to the audience and spare two likeable characters in the Trilogy.

References

External links 
 
 

2002 films
2000s French-language films
Films directed by Lucas Belvaux
Louis Delluc Prize winners
French crime thriller films
2002 crime thriller films
Belgian crime thriller films
French-language Belgian films
2000s French films